Ibibio may refer to:
Ibibio language
Ibibio people
Ibibio Sound Machine, an English electronic afro-funk band who sing in Ibibio

See also 
 Ibiblio, a digital library and archive

Language and nationality disambiguation pages